Edith Bruder is a French ethnologist who has specialized in the study of African Judaism and religious diasporas, new religious movements, and marginal religious societies. She is a research associate at the School of Oriental and African Studies (SOAS), University of London; a research associate at the French National Center for Scientific Research (CNRS); and a research fellow at the Faculty of Theology’s School of Biblical Studies and Ancient Languages, North-West University, South Africa.

She is President and founder of the International Society for the Study of African Jewry – ISSAJ. She is also involved in the development of research in philanthropy in Europe in collaboration with the Center for Research in Philanthropy (CerPhi) in Paris, France and the European Network on Philanthropy (ERNOP).

Bruder lives in Paris, where she received her education. She holds a Ph. D. in Ethnology and History from SOAS, a DESS in Clinical Psychology from Paris Diderot University, and a DEA in Art History from Pantheon-Sorbonne University.

Work
Bruder’s most significant publication, The Black Jews of Africa – History, Identity, Religion (2008), was based on extensive field work. It was the first such work to provide scientific data and a reference list that deals comprehensively with the issue of Judaism in western, central, eastern and southern Africa.

Bruder examines the trend towards Judaism in Africa at large, and explores the interdisciplinary concepts of "metaphorical diaspora," global and transnational identities, and colonization.

Bruder is a co-author of a documentary Black Jews: Juifs Noirs d’Afrique (work in progress) widely drawn from her fieldwork, with Laurence Gavron as filmmaker (Schuch Productions).

Bruder is co-editor of African Zion: Studies in Black Judaism which is an examination of Black Judaism in Africa, the United States and India.

Books

Articles in books

References

External links

Reviews
Bruder's works have been reviewed by various commentators:

French ethnologists
Living people
Year of birth missing (living people)